Rebecca Moses (born July 14, 1958) is an American fashion designer, illustrator, author based in New York City.

Early life and education
Rebecca Moses was born and raised in North Bergen, New Jersey. Moses attended the Fashion Institute of Technology in New York City. Moses moved to Italy in 1990 where she met her husband Giacomo Festa Bianchet. In 2010, Moses relocated with her two children to New York City.

Career

Fashion design
Moses developed her first collection at age 21; As one of the first American designers to enter the European market when she moved to Italy on 1992, closed her New York-based design company in 1992 and replaced Gianni Versace as designer for Donnatella Girombelli's clothing label Genny Collection and Genny Platinum in 1993. Moses continued as a consultant for Genny and Genny Platinum for some years until she developed her new label in 1996;

A week later after developing her new label in 1996, Moses opened up more than 100 accounts, including Joyce in Hong Kong; Bergdorf Goodman; Neiman Marcus; Barneys New York in Japan; Harvey Nichols and Browns in London; Janet Brown and Maxfield's in the United States; Pupi Solari and Marisa in Milan; Eichoff's and Theresa in Germany; and Victoire in Paris;.

Illustration
In 2010, Moses began working on illustration projects for Italian Vogue and other global publications, such as Vogue Japan, Icon, and Marie Claire. Moses began shifting her fashion career to painting and illustration for fashion, beauty and lifestyle brands such as Alcantara, Mac Cosmetics, Panerai, Saks Fifth Avenue, Vera Wang, Ralph Pucci, Fratelli Rossetti, La Furla, among others, are some of her creative, consulting and product collaborations.

In 2020 during the COVID-19 pandemic, Moses created a social media campaign with illustrations and letters of nurses and women around the world that was showcased as an exhibit at Mount Sinai Hospital in New York City.

Books
 Rebecca Moses, A Life Of Style: Fashion, Home, Entertainment, The Monacelli Press, October 2010.

References

External links
 
 CFDA Member

American fashion designers
American women fashion designers
1958 births
Living people
Fashion Institute of Technology alumni
21st-century American women